"Adiemus" is a world music song written by Welsh composer Karl Jenkins and performed by Miriam Stockley with Mary Carewe. It was recorded by the Adiemus project and officially released on the 1995 Adiemus: Songs of Sanctuary album.

Recording

"Adiemus" was written in 1994 by Karl Jenkins and premiered in a 1994 Delta Air Lines television advertisement.  The song was also used in some Delta in-flight videos. Jenkins chose singer Miriam Stockley as a lead vocalist due to her wide range and Purley resident Mary Carewe for additional vocals. The London Philharmonic Orchestra also performed.

The main idea was to create a modern song using classical forms, such as rondo and ternary. The lyrics themselves have no meaning. The vocals are simply used as another instrument to make music and not to convey any message. The song, written in D minor, is a mix of African-tribal and Celtic-style melodies.

The song was also used as a soundtrack within the Italian TV programme Ciao Darwin and as the opening titles music on the Biblical series Testament: The Bible in Animation.

Credits and personnel 

 Karl Jenkins – composer, lyrics, conductor, producer
 Miriam Stockley  – lead vocals 
 Mary Carewe  – additional vocals
 Mike Ratledge – arranger (programmed percussion), producer
 Mick Taylor – flute 
 London Philharmonic Orchestra - Violins, violas, cellos, double basses, percussion.

Charts

References

1995 compositions
1995 singles
Choral compositions
Compositions in D minor
Compositions by Karl Jenkins